St. Paul's Hospital is an acute care hospital located in downtown Vancouver, British Columbia, Canada. It is the oldest of the seven health care facilities operated by Providence Health Care, a Roman Catholic faith-based care provider.
St. Paul's is open to patients regardless of their faith and is home to many medical and surgical programs, including cardiac services and kidney care including an advanced structural heart disease program and North America's largest Addiction Fellowship program. It is also the home of the Pacific Adult Congenital Heart Disease unit. It is one of the teaching hospitals of the University of British Columbia Faculty of Medicine. Approximately 4000 people work at St Paul's Hospital.

On August 12, 2020, it was announced that the hospital's land in downtown Vancouver was sold to Concord Pacific for nearly $1 billion. Providence Health Care, the hospital operator, mentioned that the proceeds from this sale would go to the construction of the new St. Paul's Hospital in the False Creek Flats neighborhood, which is expected to open in 2027.

History
The original St. Paul's Hospital was founded in 1894 just eight years after the incorporation of the City of Vancouver by the Sisters Of Providence who (from their base in Montreal) founded schools, hospitals and asylums all over North America and other continents.

The 25-bed, 4-storey wood-frame building cost $28,000. It was designed and constructed by Mother Joseph of the Sacred Heart and named after the then-bishop, Paul Durieu of New Westminster.

Mother Mary Fredrick from Astoria, Oregon was the first mother superior and administrator to lead its charge. In keeping with the philosophy of the Sisters of Providence, the new hospital was founded on the pledge of providing compassionate care for everyone in need - tested by a surge in Vancouver's growth brought on by the Klondike gold rush in the 1890s.

St Paul's became one of the first hospitals with their own X-Ray machine in 1906 and opened its School of Nursing in 1907.

In 1912, the original building was demolished and replaced with a new structure to accommodate 200 patients at a construction cost of $400,000.

Father David Bauer, a Basilian priest at St. Mark's College, served as chaplain for the hospital from 1961 to 1988.

In 2010, the hospital established Angel's Cradle, the first modern Baby hatch in Canada where mothers could anonymously provide their newborns to the hospital rather than abandon them elsewhere. Thirty seconds after a baby has been placed inside the modern version of a 'foundling wheel', a sensor alerts emergency staff. A social worker contacts the Ministry of Children and Family Development which then assumes responsibility for the baby. In its first five years, two healthy babies had been placed in the baby hatch. St Paul's operates a comprehensive Indigenous Wellness and Reconciliation program, led by Indigenous staff and peers and including a Sacred Space.

St. Paul's Hospital is listed on the City of Vancouver's Heritage Register category “A” but is not a designated heritage building and is not protected by legal statute.

Redevelopment 
In the 21st Century, there has been ongoing advocacy for redevelopment of the facility. A redevelopment plan was drafted in 2010. In 2012, Premier Christy Clark said at the hospital that business case and development plans would be completed in order to begin construction in 2016.

In 2015, questions continued to be raised whether the redevelopment would maintain full range of existing services at the Burrard Street facility or move some services to a new location near False Creek. On April 13, 2015, Providence Health Care and the provincial government announced the hospital services would move to the new site and grow in size from more than 400 beds to more than 700 beds and an integrated health campus that includes a range of outpatient and ambulatory services: 
 full-service critical care hospital
 24/7 primary care services
 Chronic disease management services
 Mental health and addictions beds and programs
 On-site residential care beds and programs
 Ambulatory services and outpatient clinics
 Non-acute medical services
 A low-risk birthing centre
 End-of-life care
 Research and teaching
 Community Care
 Community Outreach Programs

Research at St. Paul's
St. Paul's is home to the Providence Healthcare Research Institute.

References

External links

The Heart Centre
St. Paul's Hospital Foundation

Hospitals in British Columbia
Buildings and structures in Vancouver
Hospitals established in 1894
Teaching hospitals in Canada
Heritage buildings in Vancouver